John Donvan (born 1955) is a journalist, broadcaster and debate moderator whose bestselling book, In a Different Key: The Story of Autism, was a Pulitzer Prize Finalist. He serves as host of Intelligence Squared U.S., a debate series dedicated to raising the level of public discourse in America.

Early life
Donvan attended Regis High School in New York City. He attended Dartmouth and Columbia University Journalism

Career
Donvan is the host of Intelligence Squared US, a forum that gathers experts to debate propositions concerning serious topics of public interest in Oxford Union-style debates which may be heard on NPR, and on Fora.TV. 

Donvan is an avid storyteller, having premiered his first one-man show "Lose the Kid" in Washington, D.C. in September 2013, under the auspices of SpeakeasyDC.

Earlier, he worked as a reporter for ABC News, including stints as Moscow and London correspondent and becoming the network's chief White House correspondent in January 1997 and a regular contributor to Nightline in 1998.

In 2016, Donvan and Caren Zucker, a journalist and television news producer, co-authored In a Different Key: The Story of Autism.  Issues discussed include the Refrigerator mother theory and the possibility of an autism epidemic.  One autistic individual covered is Donald Triplett, the first child diagnosed with autism.  Another person profiled is psychiatrist and autism pioneer Leo Kanner.  The book discusses the debate over the neurodiversity movement, especially with respect to low-functioning autistics.

Awards
Donvan's broadcast work has won four Emmy Awards, several Overseas Press Club Awards, two Cine Golden Eagles, and has been honored by the National Association of Black Journalists, the Committee of 100, and the Media Action Network for Asian-Americans. As a writer, he was a named finalist for the 2017 Pulitzer Prize in general non-fiction for "In A Different Key: The Story of Autism," and also a finalist for the 2011 National Magazine Award for his profile of Donald Triplett. Both works were co-authored with Caren Zucker.

References

External links
 
 John Donvan Correspondent Biography

1955 births
Living people
American male journalists
Journalists from New York City
Dartmouth College alumni
Place of birth missing (living people)
ABC News personalities
Regis High School (New York City) alumni
Columbia University Graduate School of Journalism alumni